Rebis Academy of Technology is a privately owned institution in Toronto, Canada which provides professional training programs and courses in engineering and management.

History
In 2004, Rebis Academy of Technology has been founded in response to the need for skilled Oil & Gas engineers and technicians in Middle East which were mostly in Abu dhabi, Dubai, Kuwait and Iran. In 2012, Rebis Academy of Technology opened its new office as a head office in Toronto, Canada.

Profile
The Academy offers a wide variety of training programs and courses form introductory to advanced in the key areas of engineering and management for university or college graduates, entry-level or experienced engineers and managers.

Departments
 Petroleum Engineering
 Chemical Engineering
 Piping Engineering
 Instrumentation & Control Engineering
 Mechanical Engineering
 Electrical Engineering
 Civil & Structural Engineering
 Inspection & Maintenance Engineering
 Safety Engineering
 Project Management

Programs & Courses
The Academy has more than 300 programs leading to certificates and diplomas in the fallowing categories:
 Petroleum Training: Provides candidates with an understanding of Exploration, Well Logging and Log Interpretation, Drilling and Completion, Production and Operations
 Chemical Training: Provides candidates with an understanding of Process Design, PFD and P&ID, Process Equipment Design and Process Simulation and Optimization
 Piping Training: Provides candidates with an understanding of Piping Design, Process Plant Layout Design and Pipe Stress Analysis
 Instrumentation & Control Training: Provides candidates with an understanding of Field Instruments and Control Valves
 Mechanical Training: Provides candidates with an understanding of Storage and Pressure Vessel Design and Analysis
 Electrical Training: Provides candidates with an understanding of Electrical Power System Design and Protection 
 Civil & Structural Training: Provides candidates with an understanding of Civil and Steel Structure Design and Analysis
 Inspection & Maintenance Training: Provides candidates with an understanding of Plant Facilities Operation, Inspection and Maintenance
 Safety Training: Provides candidates with an understanding of Process Plant Safe Design and Hazop Study
 Project Management Training Provides candidates with an understanding of EPC Project Management, Project Control and Planning

Academic Board and Instructors
The academy has 10 Academic advisers which are key instructors as well. They are responsible for maintaining the superior standards of course materials and ensuring the high-quality delivery of them.

Locations
The academy has 10 regional branches in Canada, United States, Europe, Africa, Asia and Middle East.

See also
 Higher education in Ontario
 List of colleges in Ontario

References

External links

 

Education in Toronto